Callie Marie Hernandez (born May 24, 1988) is an American actress known for her roles in the films Blair Witch (2016), La La Land (2016), The Endless (2017), and Alien: Covenant (2017).

Early life
Hernandez was born in Jacksonville, Florida and moved with her family to San Antonio, Texas when she was 7. She attended Churchill High School and studied at the University of Texas at Austin. She considers Austin her hometown. Before acting, Hernandez played the cello in several bands.

Career
In 2013, Hernandez made her debut in Machete Kills. She was cast in the ABC television series Members Only, also known as The Club, but the show was cancelled before its scheduled premiere in 2014. In 2016, she starred in Blair Witch and had a supporting role in La La Land.

From 2016 to 2017, Hernandez played Samantha in the Epix series Graves until the show's cancellation after two seasons. In 2017, she co-starred in The Endless and Alien: Covenant.<ref>{{cite news|last1=Hipes|first1=Patrick|title=Alien: Covenant' Crews Up: 'Empire's Jussie Smollett, Amy Seimetz, Carmen Ejogo & More Join Cast|url=https://deadline.com/2016/02/alien-covenant-jussie-smolett-amy-seimetz-carmen-ejogo-cast-1201708727/|access-date=June 8, 2016|website=Deadline Hollywood|date=February 25, 2016}}</ref> She appeared in Under the Silver Lake'' in 2018.

Filmography

Film

Television

Music videos

References

External links

 

Living people
21st-century American actresses
American cellists
1988 births
Actresses from Austin, Texas